"Miedo" (meaning Fear) is a single by Latin Grammy nominated Spanish singer Pablo Alborán, from his self-titled debut album. It was released on 13 May 2011 as a digital download in Spain. The song peaked at number 50 on the Spanish Singles Chart. The song was written by Pablo Alborán and produced by Manuel Illán.

Music video
A music video to accompany the release of "Miedo" was first released onto YouTube on 26 May 2011 at a total length of four minutes and seven seconds.

Track listing

Chart performance

Release history

References

External links
 Official website

2011 singles
Pablo Alborán songs
2011 songs
Songs written by Pablo Alborán
EMI Records singles